Peachtree Park is a neighborhood in the Buckhead Community of Atlanta, Georgia.

It is bounded by:

 Peachtree Road and North Buckhead on the northwest
 Georgia 400 and Lenox Square and Pine Hills on the east
 MARTA north-south rail line and the Miami Circle design district of Lindbergh/Morosgo on the southeast
 Piedmont Road and Buckhead Village and Garden Hills on the west

Historic district
The neighborhood is roughly contiguous with the Peachtree Highlands-Peachtree Park Historic District, listed on the National Register of Historic Places.

The district is significant for a collection of architectural styles from 1921–1957 and for community planning and development. Styles include Colonial Revival, Craftsman, and English Vernacular revival.

The district was listed on April 25, 2008 (listing number 08000325) and is larger than its predecessor, the Peachtree Highlands Historic District (listed 1986), which it superseded.

Government
Peachtree Park is part of Neighborhood planning unit (NPU) B.

External links
 Peachtree Park Civic Association
 Peachtree Park Civic Association on Facebook

References

Historic districts in Atlanta
Neighborhoods in Atlanta
Bungalow architecture in Georgia (U.S. state)
Historic districts on the National Register of Historic Places in Georgia (U.S. state)
National Register of Historic Places in Atlanta